Education in Shanghai includes five years of primary education, four years of junior secondary education, and three years of senior secondary education, as well as higher education, including universities and colleges.

Tertiary education

Shanghai is a major center of higher education in China with over 50 universities and colleges. As of 2022, Shanghai ranked 3rd globally and 2nd in the Asia & Oceania region (after Beijing) by scientific research outputs, measured by the Nature Index. A number of China's most prestigious universities entering global university rankings are based in Shanghai, including Fudan University, Shanghai Jiao Tong University, Tongji University, East China Normal University (these universities are selected as "985 universities" by the Chinese Government in order to build world-class universities). In 2002, Fudan University established a joint EMBA program with Washington University in St. Louis, which has since been consistently ranked as one of the best in the world. In 2012, NYU Shanghai was established in Pudong by New York University in partnership with East China Normal University as the first Sino-US joint venture university. In 2013 the Shanghai Municipality and the Chinese Academy of Sciences founded the ShanghaiTech University in the Zhangjiang Hi-Tech Park in Pudong. This new research university is aiming to be a first-class institution on a national and international level. The cadre school China Executive Leadership Academy in Pudong is also located in Shanghai, as well as the China Europe International Business School.

Historically Shanghai was a center of higher education. In 1949 it, which at the time held 1.43% of the people in the country, had 41 institutions of higher education, 20% of the country's total number of such.

Primary and secondary education

The city government's education agency is the Shanghai Municipal Education Commission.

Children with foreign passports are permitted to attend any public school in Shanghai. Prior to 2007 they were permitted to attend 150 select public schools. In 2006 about 2,000 non-Chinese nationals under 18 years of age attended Shanghai public schools. Students with Hanyu Shuiping Kaoshi (HSK) above 3 or 4 may attend public schools using Mandarin Chinese as the medium of instruction, while students below HSK 3–4 may attend international divisions of public schools or private international schools.

Shanghai ranked first in the 2009 and 2012 Program for International Student Assessment (PISA), a worldwide study of academic performance of 15-year-old students conducted by the OECD. Shanghai students, including migrant children, scored highest in every aspect (math, reading and science) in the world. The study concludes that public-funded schools in Shanghai have the highest educational quality in the world. Critics of PISA results counter that, in Shanghai and other Chinese cities, most children of migrant workers can only attend city schools up to the ninth grade, and must return to their parents' hometowns for high school due to hukou restrictions, thus skewing the composition of the city's high school students in favor of wealthier local families.

The 2010 census shows that out of Shanghai's total population, 22.0% had a college education, double the level from 2000, while 21.0% had high school, 36.5% middle school, and 1.35% primary school education. 2.74% of residents age 15 and older were illiterate.

 Shanghai has more than 930 kindergartens, 1,200 primary and 850 middle schools. Over 760,000 middle schools students and 871,000 primary school students are taught by 76,000 and 64,000 teaching staff respectively.

The city government has a financing scheme meant to spread resources to lower income areas by collecting taxes from all areas and then redistributing the money according to need.

History
In the late Qing Dynasty, school districts were introduced into Shanghai, allowing for communities to set local education policies and making education more common. By 1936, 59% of children total were enrolled in educational institutions; of those enrolled in school, about two-thirds were boys and the rest were girls. Grace C. L. Mak and Leslie N. K. Lo, authors of "Education," wrote that education in the city was "way ahead the rest of China" in 1949 although those standards would have been "weak" in 1996. Virtually all children of primary school age in urban areas in the city were enrolled in school by 1958, and by 1983 the same went for children of those ages in rural areas of Shanghai Municipality. Shanghai was the first city in the country to implement 9-year mandatory education consisting of elementary school and junior high school. The city previously designated "key schools" or favored schools which received more resources than others, but ended the system in 1994.

A third party management system called "entrusted management", in which low performing schools received outside management, was given trials in 2005 and permanently established in 2007.

In September 2021 the Shanghai authorities will begin requiring children in primary and secondary to study Xi Jinping thought. Additionally, from that date primary schools will no longer have final examinations about the English language.

International schools
 Shanghai had about 20 international schools. As of 2015 Shanghai has the largest number of international schools of any city in China.

Schools for children of foreign residents include:
 Britannica International School Shanghai
 Dulwich College Shanghai
 Concordia International School Shanghai
 Fudan International School
 German School Shanghai (Hongqiao and Yangpu Campuses)
 Harrow Shanghai
 Hong Qiao International School - Rainbow Bridge International School
 Japanese Classroom Shanghai Educational Academy
 Lycée Français de Shanghai (Hongqiao and Yangpu Campuses)
 The International Division of No. 2 High School of East China Normal University
 Nord Anglia International School Shanghai Pudong
 Shanghai American School
 Shanghai Community International School
 Shanghai Experimental School International Division
 International Division of Shanghai Foreign Language School Affiliated to Shanghai International Studies University
 Shanghai High School International Division
 Shanghai Hishou Japanese Continuation Study Center
 Shanghai Japanese School
 Shanghai Jincai High School International Division
 Shanghai Korean School
 Shanghai Livingston American School
 Shanghai Qinghai Korea Academy
 Shanghai Soong Ching Ling School International Division
 Shanghai Singapore International School
 Shanghai Sundai School
 Shanghai Yimai Japanese Mandarin Learning Institute
 Toshin International After School
 Wellington College International Shanghai
 Western International School of Shanghai
 Yew Chung International School of Shanghai

Kindergartens for children of foreign residents include:
 OISCA Shanghai Japanese Kindergarten
 Shanghai Angel Kindergarten
 Shanghai Utsukushigaoka Montessori Kindergarten
 Toshin International Kindergarten
 Tiny Tots International Pre-School and Kindergarten

Other international schools include:
 Adcote School Shanghai
 Bond Canadian Academy
 The British International School Shanghai, Puxi Campus
 Canadian International Academy
 Canadian Trillium College
 International Philippine School Shanghai
 Maple Leaf International High School — Shanghai
 Nord Anglia Chinese International School
 Russian Consulate School in Shanghai
 Shanghai Pinghe School
 Shanghai United International School
 The SMIC Private School
 Shanghai World Foreign Language Middle School
 YK Pao School

Defunct:
 Shanghai Rego International School

References
 Zhang, Minxuan, Jinjie Xu, and Chuangyuan Sun. "Effective Teachers for Successful Schools and High Performing Students: The Case of Shanghai" (Chapter 9). In: Lee, Sing Kong, Wing On Lee, and Ee Ling Low (editors). Educational Policy Innovations: Levelling Up and Sustaining Educational Achievement. Springer Science & Business Media, 27 October 2013. , 9789814560085. Start: p. 143.

Notes

Further reading
 Tucker, Marc S. Surpassing Shanghai: An Agenda for American Education Built on the World's Leading Systems. Harvard Education Press, 1 November 2011. , 9781612504575.